Juan Morales Hechavarría (born July 12, 1948 in Santiago de Cuba) is a former Cuban athlete who competed mainly in 110 metres hurdles. Together with Hermes Ramírez, Pablo Montes, and Enrique Figuerola he won an Olympic silver medal in 4 x 100 metres relay in Mexico City 1968. He was a prominent athlete in the American and Caribbean scene, winning the Central American and Caribbean Championships four times in a row. He was not able to compete for his fifth title as the 1975 event was cancelled due to torrential rain. Alejandro Casañas would eventually take over his role as the leading Cuban hurdler.

Achievements
1973 Central American and Caribbean Championships - gold medal
1971 Central American and Caribbean Championships - gold medal
1971 Pan American Games - bronze medal
1970 Central American and Caribbean Games - gold medal
1969 Central American and Caribbean Championships - gold medal
1968 Summer Olympics - silver medal (4 × 100 m relay)
1967 Central American and Caribbean Championships - gold medal
1967 Pan American Games - bronze medal
1966 Central American and Caribbean Games - bronze medal

External links 
 trackfield.brinkster
 
 

1948 births
Living people
Sportspeople from Santiago de Cuba
Cuban male sprinters
Cuban male hurdlers
Olympic athletes of Cuba
Athletes (track and field) at the 1967 Pan American Games
Athletes (track and field) at the 1968 Summer Olympics
Athletes (track and field) at the 1971 Pan American Games
Athletes (track and field) at the 1972 Summer Olympics
Olympic silver medalists for Cuba
Pan American Games silver medalists for Cuba
Pan American Games medalists in athletics (track and field)
Medalists at the 1968 Summer Olympics
Olympic silver medalists in athletics (track and field)
Central American and Caribbean Games gold medalists for Cuba
Competitors at the 1966 Central American and Caribbean Games
Competitors at the 1970 Central American and Caribbean Games
Universiade silver medalists for Cuba
Universiade medalists in athletics (track and field)
Central American and Caribbean Games medalists in athletics
Medalists at the 1970 Summer Universiade
Medalists at the 1967 Pan American Games
Medalists at the 1971 Pan American Games